Spirolaxis is a genus of sea snails, marine gastropod mollusks in the family Architectonicidae, the staircase shells or sundials.

Species
 Spirolaxis argonauta Bieler, 1993
 Spirolaxis centrifuga (Monterosato, 1890)
 Spirolaxis clenchi Jaume & Borro, 1946
 † Spirolaxis cohaerentia Laws, 1944 
 Spirolaxis cornuammonis (Melvill & Standen, 1903)
 Spirolaxis cornuarietis Bieler, 1993
 Spirolaxis exornatus Bieler, 1993
 Spirolaxis lamellifer (Rehder, 1935)
 Spirolaxis rotulacatharinea (Melvill & Standen, 1903)
Synonyms
 Spirolaxis macandrewi (Iredale,1911 ): synonym of Spirolaxis centrifuga (Monterosato, 1890)

References

 Rolán E., 2005. Malacological Fauna From The Cape Verde Archipelago. Part 1, Polyplacophora and Gastropoda

External links
 Monterosato, T. A. di. (1913). Note on the genus Pseudomalaxis, Fischer, and descriptions of a new species and sub-genus. Proceedings of the Malacological Society of London. 10(6): 362-363
 Rehder H.A. 1935. New Caribbean marine shells. The Nautilus, 48: 127-130
 Gofas, S.; Le Renard, J.; Bouchet, P. (2001). Mollusca. in: Costello, M.J. et al. (eds), European Register of Marine Species: a check-list of the marine species in Europe and a bibliography of guides to their identification. Patrimoines Naturels. 50: 180-213

Architectonicidae